Northern Metropolis is a planning area, consisting of two district administration areas, including North District and Yuen Long District in the northern New Territories in Hong Kong. It is envisioned as an integrated living and economic region aimed at leveraging the strengths of integration with Shenzhen.

The development strategy is also focus on strengthening the radiation of Hong Kong with comprehensive footholds in the Guangdong–Hong Kong–Macau Greater Bay Area. Chief Executive Carrie Lam stressed that connects with the Greater Bay Area and facilitates Hong Kong's development integration with Shenzhen.

See also 
 New towns of Hong Kong
 Lantau Tomorrow Vision
 North East New Territories New Development Areas Planning
 Guangdong–Hong Kong–Macau Greater Bay Area

References 

Hong Kong
New Territories
Urban planning in Hong Kong
Proposed infrastructure in Hong Kong